Surviving Y2K was a podcast hosted by Dan Taberski and produced by Pineapple Street Media and Topic Studios.

Background 
The podcast was a six episode documentary that premiered on November 13, 2018. The podcast was hosted by Dan Taberski and produced by Pineapple Street Media and Topic Studios. The show was the second in a set of anthologies by Taberski called Headlong—Missing Richard Simmons was the first. The podcast focuses on the hysteria caused by the Year 2000 problem. The podcast discusses Taberski's own life changing events that occurred that new year. Nicholas Quah of Vulture described the show as "[f]unny, poetic, and wonderfully written."

References

External links 

2018 podcast debuts
2018 podcast endings
Audio podcasts
Documentary podcasts
American podcasts